Rod Bryan is a musician and multimedia producer.  He is a founding member and bass player in the band Ho-Hum. In 2001, he opened Anthro-Pop, an influential, independent record store in Little Rock, Arkansas. In 2006 he gathered 10,000 signatures in the months of March and April to become the first independent candidate on the ballot for governor of Arkansas in over 60 years. After Bryan gained ballot access, the Green Party and Libertarian Party also successfully sued for ballot access. The campaign was the subject of the documentary film 40 Miles Below Hope, directed by Huixia Lu. Bryan is a founding member of the Magic Cropdusters and has also performed as Western Meds, First Baptist Chemical, Baseline and Chicot, Match Head, Cavebeast, and Brownsbee.

Bryan released two solo albums in 2013 in response to the Exxon-Mobil pipeline rupture near Mayflower, Arkansas. He also toured and wrote extensively about his efforts to document and appropriately remediate effects of the spill.

References 

American male bass guitarists
Living people
Arkansas Independents
Year of birth missing (living people)